Discoverer 12 was an American optical reconnaissance satellite launched on 29 Jun 1960 at 22:00:44 GMT. The fourth of five test flights of the Corona KH-1 spy satellite series, it was lost when the second stage failed during launch.

Background

"Discoverer" was the civilian designation and cover for the Corona satellite photo-reconnaissance series of satellites managed by the Advanced Research Projects Agency of the Department of Defense and the U.S. Air Force. The primary goal of the satellites was to replace the U-2 spyplane in surveilling the Sino-Soviet Bloc, determining the disposition and speed of production of Soviet missiles and long-range bombers assess. The Corona program was also used to produce maps and charts for the Department of Defense and other US government mapping programs.

The first series of Corona satellites were the Keyhole 1 (KH-1) satellites based on the Agena-A upper stage, which not only offered housing but whose engine provided attitude control in orbit. The KH-1 payload included the C (for Corona) single, vertical-looking, panoramic camera that scanned back and forth, exposing its film at a right angle to the line of flight. Film was returned from orbit by a single General Electric Satellite Return Vehicle (SRV) constructed by General Electric. The SRV was equipped with an onboard small solid-fuel retro motor to deorbit at the end of the mission. Recovery of the capsule was done in mid-air by a specially equipped aircraft.

The Discoverer program began with a series of three test flights whose satellites carried no cameras, all launched in the first half of 1959. There followed eight operational Discoverer satellites, all of them partial or complete failures, though Discoverer 11, launched 15 April 1960, carrying a new vacuum-resistant film, was the first mission on which the onboard camera worked properly. After the failure of Discoverer 11 on reentry, caused by the explosion of its spin motor, it was decided that the following mission would be a diagnostic flight to determine the causes of the various issues plaguing the program.

Spacecraft

The battery-powered satellite, like prior Discoverers was housed in an Agena-A stage and composed of a satellite bus and SRV. Discoverer 12 was largely identical to Discoverer 8; however, instead of mounting the "C" (for Corona) surveillance camera, the SRV contained extra telemetry. The SRV included a doppler beacon and external lights for tracking purposes. The combination of bus and SRV massed , the SRV alone massing  Discoverer 12 also carried a newly developed gas motor for spin stabilization to replace the system that had caused the loss of Discoverer 11.

Mission

Launched 29 Jun 1960 at 22:00:44 GMT from Vandenberg LC 75-3-4 by a Thor DM-21 Agena-A rocket, the mission ended in failure when the Agena second stage malfunctioned.

Legacy

Though Discoverer 12 was a loss, Corona engineers had confidence in the new spin motor as well as the previously demonstrated film. In fact, the  following test mission, Discoverer 13, was a complete success and paved the way for the first fully successful flight, Discoverer 14, launched on August 18, 1960. The Corona program went want on to comprise 145 flights in eight satellite series, the last mission launching on 25 May 1972. CORONA was declassified in 1995, and a formal acknowledgement of the existence of US reconnaissance programs, past and present, was issued in September 1996.

References

Spacecraft launched in 1960
Spacecraft which reentered in 1960